Luciana Yael Salvado (born 13 April 1990) is an Argentine handball player for Club Ferro Carril Oeste and the Argentina women's national handball team.

She defended Argentina at the 2011 World Women's Handball Championship in Brazil.

Achievements
Argentinean Clubs Championship: 2015

References

External links

1990 births
Living people
Argentine female handball players
Handball players at the 2016 Summer Olympics
Olympic handball players of Argentina
Pan American Games medalists in handball
Pan American Games silver medalists for Argentina
Handball players at the 2011 Pan American Games
Handball players at the 2015 Pan American Games
Medalists at the 2011 Pan American Games
Medalists at the 2015 Pan American Games
20th-century Argentine women
21st-century Argentine women